The Daily Express is a conservative, middle-market British tabloid newspaper and the flagship title of Express Newspapers.

Daily Express may also refer to:

 Daily Express (Dublin), a former Irish newspaper
 Daily Express (Scotland), a former Scottish newspaper which merged with the Caledonian Mercury in 1859 to form the Caledonian Mercury and Daily Express
 Daily Express (Urdu newspaper), an Urdu-language newspaper in Pakistan
 Daily Express (Malaysia), an English-language newspaper in Sabah, Malaysia
 Daily Express (Trinidad), Trinidadian English-language daily